Ernesto Escobedo was the defending champion but chose not to defend his title.

Gabriel Diallo won the title after defeating Shang Juncheng 7–5, 7–6(7–5) in the final.

Seeds

Draw

Finals

Top half

Bottom half

References

External links
Main draw
Qualifying draw

Championnats Banque Nationale de Granby - 1
2022 Men's singles